Yogi's Ark Lark is a 1972 animated television special produced by Hanna-Barbera, intended to raise ecological awareness. It was broadcast on September 16, 1972, as part of The ABC Saturday Superstar Movie and served as the four-part episode for Yogi's Gang.

Aside from its environmental message, the film marked a milestone in Hanna-Barbera's history: a wide range of the studio’s characters were united in one story for the first time.  This set the tone for future series and specials, such as Laff-A-Lympics and Yogi's First Christmas.

Plot
Concerned about the terrible state of the environment, dozens of animals gather for a meeting in Jellystone Park, chaired by Yogi Bear. They decide to leave their homes and search for "the perfect place" — a place free of pollution, deforestation, and other forms of mankind's despoilment. Jellystone maintenance man Noah Smitty helps them build a flying ship (which looks like Noah's Ark with a propeller on top) for their journey, and they decide to name it after him. Because "Smitty's Houseboat" is too long to paint on the bow, they name it "Noah's Ark." With Yogi at the helm, they travel to places around the world, searching for "the perfect place."

They start by driving down the highway into the ocean, where they soon end up on the back of a sleeping Moby Dick. Huckleberry Hound is sent down to wake him. They then end up stranded in the Sahara Desert which they originally mistake for a beach. The desert sun causes Yogi to hallucinate and believe he is pharaoh King Tut and his friends are his slaves, until Boo-Boo and Noah Smitty arrive. Some moments later, So-So the monkey spots an oasis, which is "the perfect place." As Yogi and crew settle down to make themselves at home, Lambsy spots a "dragon" which turns out to be a construction vehicle developing a new city. Yogi and the crew then take their leave of the area. They arrive in Antarctic territory, which is a new and improved "perfect place." They begin settling there, until a similar situation happens like at the oasis. Next, Yogi and the crew wind up in outer space upon going up too far, which is a brand new "perfect place." It isn’t long before Earth ejects its "junk" (missiles, satellites, etc.) into space.

With the Ark back on earth and sailing the sea, tensions arise between the animals: Huck throws water down a pipe which causes Dum Dum to emerge and throw water at him, Quick Draw McGraw insults Snagglepuss’ slicing of salami, Peter Potamus insults Magilla Gorilla by telling him he looks like a gorilla, and Lippy the Lion grows tired of Hardy Har Har's complaining. Yogi Bear becomes aware of this just as So-So spots a typhoon coming. The animals struggle to survive the typhoon. The typhoon lands them on top of a mountain, and the animals almost believe that they’ve found what they’ve been looking for... only to be disappointed again when Yakky Doodle returns with an empty tin can and the animals notice a deforestation occurring.

At this point, the younger animals (consisting of Atom Ant, Augie Doggie, Baba Looey, Benny the Ball, Boo-Boo, Lambsy, Pixie and Dixie, Shag Rugg, Touché Turtle and Yakky Doodle) decide that they should all simply go back home and clean up the messes that they were trying to escape. This decision is met with unanimous approval, and the animals all head for home so that they can start turning it into "the perfect place".

During the credits, Wally Gator and Squiddly Diddly are cleaning the rivers, Paw and Shag Rugg are picking up garbage around their house, and Yogi Bear picks up a recently discarded hamburger wrapper.

List of characters
The following Hanna-Barbera characters appeared in this movie (not all of whom appeared on Yogi’s Gang) in alphabetical order:

 Atom Ant
 Augie Doggie and Doggie Daddy
 The Hillbilly Bears
 Hokey Wolf and Ding-A-Ling
 Huckleberry Hound
 Lambsy
 Lippy the Lion & Hardy Har Har
 Magilla Gorilla
 Moby Dick (from Moby Dick and Mighty Mightor)
 Peter Potamus and So-So
 Pixie and Dixie
 Quick Draw McGraw and Baba Looey
 Ruff and Reddy
 Sawtooth the Beaver (Rufus Ruffcut's pet beaver on Wacky Races)
 Secret Squirrel
 Snagglepuss
 Squiddly Diddly
 Top Cat and his gang (Benny the Ball, Spook, Choo-Choo, Fancy-Fancy, and Brain)
 Touché Turtle and Dum Dum
 Wally Gator
 Yakky Doodle and Chopper
 Yogi Bear and Boo-Boo
 An unknown dinosaur character

Differences between pilot and series
 Although this was the pilot for Yogi's Gang, some changes were made for the series:
 Noah Smitty was written out, and only the animals were on the ark.
 The vessel’s name was changed from "Noah's Ark" to "Yogi's Ark".
 Some of the animals, such as Top Cat, were also written out, thus giving the ark a smaller crew.
 This one-hour feature was later turned into two half-hour episodes of Yogi's Gang with new intro and concluding sequences for each episode. To fit the feature into these new time frames, some of its sequences were shortened or edited out.
 The song "The Perfect Place" is sung six times throughout the film, and would later be remade as the theme song for Yogi's Gang, with different lyrics.

Cast
 Daws Butler – Yogi Bear, Huckleberry Hound, Quick Draw McGraw, Snagglepuss, Wally Gator, Peter Potamus, Augie Doggie,  Lippy the Lion, Dixie, Baba Looey, Lambsy, Top Cat
 Henry Corden – Paw Rugg, Truck Driver #1
 Walker Edmiston – Squiddly Diddly, Yakky Doodle
 Allan Melvin – Magilla Gorilla, Truck Driver #2, Man
 Don Messick – Boo-Boo, Atom Ant, Touché Turtle, Pixie, So-So, Moby Dick
 John Stephenson – Benny the Ball, Doggie Daddy, Hardy Har Har
 Jean Vander Pyl – Flo Rugg, Maw Rugg, Woman
 Lennie Weinrib – Cap'n Noah Smitty

Home media
Yogi's Ark Lark was released on the Yogi's Gang: The Complete Series DVD from the Warner Archive Collection on February 19, 2013.

See also
 List of works produced by Hanna-Barbera
 The Yogi Bear Show
 The New Yogi Bear Show
 Yogi's Treasure Hunt
 Yogi's Gang

References

External links
 
 
 Toonarific Cartoons: Pictures from Yogi's Ark Lark

1972 television films
1972 films
Hanna-Barbera animated films
Animated crossover films
The ABC Saturday Superstar Movie
Environmental films
Films directed by William Hanna
Films directed by Joseph Barbera
Noah's Ark in film
Yogi Bear films
Top Cat films
Huckleberry Hound films
1970s American animated films
Films produced by Joseph Barbera
Films produced by William Hanna
Films scored by Hoyt Curtin